Kallebäck is one of 8 districts in Örgryte borough, Gothenburg, Sweden.

The name Kallebäck means "The brook with the cauldron" and the name dates back to 1496.

The buildings in Kallebäck mostly consists of apartment buildings built between 1960 and 1970. The buildings in the north part of Kallebäck are generally lower, with only 3-4 floors. The buildings nearer to the highway E6 are higher: 12 floors. As part of Bostad2021, 1800 apartments are being built, with move in dates ranging from 2021 to 2027, along Smörgatan. The area also has a 14 stories high building, named Ostkupan  ("The cheese cover") with about 360 students, and its own pub in the basement.

The population mostly belong to the middle class, and most of them are retired or students.
All streetnames in Kallebäck are named after dairy products.

History
 On November 28, 2004, there was a shootout at Mejerigatan 2, just outside Ostkupan. The car thieves were cornered by the police. One officer was wounded and had to be taken to the university hospital in Gothenburg before the thieves were arrested. They were later charged for attempted murder. 
 In 2004, a car bomb exploded in an almost empty parking lot. No one was injured.

Geography
Kallebäck is located in Örgryte borough, which contains 7 more distinct:
 Bagaregården
 Kärralund
 Lunden
 Olskroken
 Redbergslid
 Skår
 Överås

External links
Official website: Göteborgs Stad - Örgryte (in Swedish)

Gothenburg